This is a list of justices of the Supreme Court of Sri Lanka. Justices are placed in the order in which they took the judicial oath of office and thereby started their term of office. While many of the justices' positions prior to appointment are simply listed as "lawyer", many had part-time positions, such as teaching, or acted as counsel to various levels of government.

Justices

See also
 List of chief justices of Sri Lanka
 List of justices of the Supreme Court of Sri Lanka by court composition

Notes

References

Bibliography
 

Sri Lanka